Châtelard Castle may refer to:

 Châtelard Castle, Aosta Valley - a castle in the town of La Salle in the Italian Aosta Valley
 Châtelard Castle, Vaud - a castle in the Montreux area of the Swiss canton of Vaud

See also 
 Châtelard